George Martin Kuzma (July 24, 1925 – December 7, 2008) was an American bishop of the Ruthenian Greek Catholic Church.

At the age of 29, Kuzma was ordained as a priest. He was appointed auxiliary bishop of Passaic in New Jersey on November 11, 1986. He was later appointed Bishop of Van Nuys in California on October 23, 1990. He retired from the post on December 5, 2000. He was succeeded by Bishop William Skurla.

Kuzma died on December 7, 2008, and is buried in Uniontown, Pennsylvania.

References

External links
Catholic-Hierarchy - George Kuzma

1925 births
2008 deaths
Ruthenian Catholic bishops
American Eastern Catholic bishops
20th-century Roman Catholic bishops in the United States